Hagia Irene or Hagia Eirene ("Holy Peace"), sometimes known also as Saint Irene, is an Eastern Orthodox church located in the outer courtyard of Topkapı Palace in Istanbul. It is the oldest known church in Istanbul and the only Byzantine church in Istanbul that has not been converted into a mosque, as it was used as an arsenal for storing weapons until the 19th century. The Hagia Irene today operates as a museum and concert hall.

Naming 
The church was dedicated to the peace of God, and is one of the three shrines which emperors devoted to God's attributes, together with Hagia Sophia (Wisdom) and Hagia Dynamis.

History

Origins

The building reputedly stands on the site of a pre-Christian temple. It ranks as the first church completed in Constantinople, before Hagia Sophia, during its transformation from a Greek trading colony to the eastern capital of the Roman Empire. According to later tradition, the Roman emperor Constantine I commissioned the first Hagia Irene church in the 4th century, which was completed by the end of his reign (337). It served as the church of the Patriarchate before Hagia Sophia was completed in 360 under Constantius II. During the Nika revolt in 532, Hagia Irene was burned down. Emperor Justinian I had the church rebuilt in 548. It was then damaged again by the 740 Constantinople earthquake on October 20, 740, about six months before the death of Leo III. The Emperor Constantine V ordered the restorations and had its interior decorated with mosaics and frescoes. Some restorations from this time have survived to the present.

Arsenal 
After the Ottoman conquest of Constantinople in 1453 by Mehmed II, the church was enclosed inside the walls of the Topkapi palace. The Janissaries used the church as an arsenal (Cebehane) until 1826. It was also used as a warehouse for military equipment and repository for trophies of arms and military regalia taken by the Turks. During the reign of Sultan Ahmet III (1703–1730) it was converted into the National Military Museum in 1726.

In 1846, Marshal of the Imperial Arsenal, Ahmed Fethi Paşa, made the church a military antiques museum. It was used as the Military Museum from 1908 until 1978 when it was then turned over to the Turkish Ministry of Culture.

Concert hall 
Today, the Hagia Irene serves mainly as a concert hall for classical music performances, due to its extraordinary acoustic characteristics and impressive atmosphere. Many of the concerts of the Istanbul International Music Festival have been held here every summer since 1980.

In 2000, the Turkish haute couture designer Faruk Saraç produced a special show here.  A collection of 700 designed pieces inspired by the Ottoman sultans, including the robes of 36 sultans ranging from Osman Gazi, the founder of the Ottoman Empire to the last sultan, Mehmed VI, were on display.  The show was accompanied by music and the story of the sultans' lives and demonstrations of Ottoman-era dancing.

For many years, the Hagia Irene was only accessible during events or by special permission, but the museum has been open to the public every day except Tuesday since January 2014.

Structure

Church architecture 

Reconstruction during the reign of Justinian I shows change in the architecture of the atrium and narthex, which stayed intact after the earthquake. Restoration after the earthquake created a stronger foundation for the church. Before being rebuilt, the foundation had significant structural problems. This restoration established a cross-domed plan on the gallery level while still being able to keep the original basilica plan at the ground level. The narthex can be found to the west, preceded by the atrium, and then the apse on the east side. Hagia Irene still holds its dome and has peaked roofs on the north, west, and south sides of the church. The dome itself is 15m wide and 35m high and has twenty windows. Hagia Irene has the typical form of a Roman basilica, consisting of a nave and two aisles, which are divided by three pairs of piers. This helps support the galleries above the narthex. Semicircular arches are also attached to the capitals which also helps give support to the galleries above.

Art inside the church 

In Byzantine tradition, there is a unique vestige of the Iconoclastic art within the church. The apse semidome and the bema arch are covered with mosaics. There are also the frescoes which can be found on the south side aisle. These mosaics date back to about the 8th century. This was during the time of the earthquake which most of the upper parts of the church can date back to. There is also a mosaic of a cross, which is outlined in black with a gold ground. The ends are flared along with having teardrop shapes at the end. This extends around the base of the semidome. The cross was put in during the reconstruction by Constantine V, which was during the Iconoclastic years. On the bema arch there is an inscription of Psalm 64 verses 4–5 on the inner side, and then on the outer side there is an inscription of Amos 6 verse 6. There is evidence of alterations on these inscriptions as well. The inscriptions detail a praise to the church as it is the house of the lord. The verses, especially the Psalm, were used as inspiration for some of the mosaics in Hagia Sophia.

Hagia Irene also holds a synthronon. Synthronons are rows of built benches that are arranged in a semicircle in the apse. During Divine Liturgy this is where the clergy would sit. This is the only synthronon that has survived in the city from the Byzantine era. The synthronon in Hagia Irene has six tiers of seats. There are doors at both side that open up into an ambulatory beneath the fourth tier of seats.

Gallery

See also 
History of Roman and Byzantine domes

References

Bibliography 
 
 Bogdanovic Jelena, "Hagia Eirene", 2008, Encyclopedia of the Hellenic World, Constantinople
 
 Freely, John; Cakmak, Ahmet (2004). Byzantine Monuments of Istanbul. Cambridge University Press. pp. 136–143.  
 "Irene, Church of Saint – Oxford Reference". doi:10.1093/acref/9780195046526.001.0001/acref-9780195046526-e-2506.
 
 
 
 
 Millingen, Alexander Van, Ramsey Traquair, Walter S. George, and Arthur e. Henderson. Byzantine churches in Constantinople: their history and architecture. London: Macmillan and Co., Limited, 1912. Print.
 Musilek, Josef, Lubos Podolka, and Monika Karkova, "The Unique Construction of the Church of Hagia Irene in Istanbul for The Teaching of Byzantine Architecture." Priced Engineering, 161 (2016): 1745–750. Web.
 Pyhrr, Stuart (1989). "European Armor from the Imperial Ottoman Arsenal". Metropolitan Museum Journal. 24: 85–116

External links 

 Byzantium 1200 | Hagia Eirene
 Over 100 pictures inside and out

4th-century churches
540s in the Byzantine Empire
6th-century churches
Byzantine sacred architecture
Fatih
Church buildings with domes
Former churches in Turkey
Hagia Irene
Topkapı Palace
548